James Barker Coykendall IV is an American mathematician.

Coykendall earned his bachelor's degree from the California Institute of Technology in 1989 and completed a doctorate at Cornell University in 1995. His thesis, titled Normsets and Rings of Algebraic Integers, was overseen by Shankar Sen. Coykendall's teaching career began the next year at North Dakota State University, where he was named James A. Meier Professor in 2003. Coykendall and Hal Schenck have served as editors of the Journal of Commutative Algebra since the publication's first issue in 2009. Coykendall joined the faculty of Clemson University in 2013.

References

California Institute of Technology alumni
Cornell University alumni
North Dakota State University faculty
Living people
Year of birth missing (living people)
21st-century American mathematicians
20th-century American mathematicians
Clemson University faculty
Mathematics journal editors
Algebraists